Solomonic means pertaining to Solomon. It is used specifically to refer to

 Judgment of Solomon ("Solomonic wisdom")
 Solomonic column in architecture
 Solomonic dynasty in Ethiopian history